Big Branch is the name for many rivers and streams.  If can also refer to:

Big Branch (Middle Fork Salt River tributary), a stream in Missouri
Big Branch (Skull Lick Creek tributary), a stream in Missouri
Big Branch (Haw River tributary), a stream in Alamance County, North Carolina
Big Branch (Lanes Creek tributary), a stream in Anson County, North Carolina
Big Branch (Crabtree Creek tributary), a stream in Wake County, North Carolina
Big Branch Marsh National Wildlife Refuge
Upper Big Branch Mine disaster